Well Kept Secret may refer to:
 Well Kept Secret (John Martyn album)
 Well Kept Secret (Juice Newton album)